Mey or MEY may refer to:

Places
Mey, Moselle, France
Mey, Highland, Scotland
Castle of Mey
Loch of Mey
East Mey, Highland, Scotland

Other uses
 Mey (surname), including a list of people with the name
Mey (instrument), a Turkish folk instrument
Mey-Air, a defunct Norwegian airline
Hassaniya Arabic, ISO 639-3 language code mey
Sherdukpen language, or Mey
Meghauli Airport, Bagmati Province, Nepal, IATA airport code MEY

See also

May (disambiguation)
Mei (disambiguation)